Microcar is a French microcar manufacturer.  The company was founded in 1984 as a division of Bénéteau group, a major sailboat manufacturer.  Production moved to a new custom-built factory in September 2000. In September 2008, Microcar was acquired by Ligier Automobiles in a deal backed by the Italian private equity firm 21 Investimenti Partners. The merger created Europe's second-biggest manufacturer of microcars, and largest maker of quadricycles, or "sans permis" (license-exempt) vehicles. The Microcar and Ligier brands are to retain their separate identities and production facilities. Phillipe Ligier, son of company founder Guy Ligier, is CEO of the expanded Ligier Automobiles.

Current models 

The current model range consists of the M.GO-3, introduced (in 2015?) to replace M.Go model introduced in 2009. There are six trim levels, all with petrol engines, in the UK.  The M.Go was available in conventional, diesel-engined S, S PACK, MICA, SXI, and Sport trim levels, as well as full electric.

Prior to the M.Go, Microcar was known for their long-running MC Series models, sold as the MC1 and MC2. Both where available as a 2-seat, or 4-seat long wheel base version. The long wheel base being 40mm longer than the short Virgo models. The company also sold a small commercial vehicle called the Sherpa, which was a badge-engineered Ligier X-Pro. The Sherpa was discontinued after the Ligier merger, and the MC has been dropped in favor of the new M.Go. The M.Go was only produced with a petrol engine for the UK market.

Former models 
 Microcar Family Luxe
 Microcar Lyra
 Microcar ALCO
 Microcar NewStreet, NewStreet Cabriolet
 Microcar Pratic Luxe
 Microcar Virgo
 Microcar Virgo 2
 Microcar Virgo 3
 Microcar Virgo Luxe

Electric vehicles 
From 1994 Alco electric was built.
From 2006 to 2010, the long-wheelbase version of Microcar's MC Series was used as the basis for the ZENN EV assembled in Canada by ZENN Motor Company with an electric drivetrain. Microcar began distributing the ZENN in Europe during 2007 under its own brand, as the Microcar ZENN. ZENN Motor purchased engineless, rolling chassis from Microcar and installed their own electric motor and drivetrain. The ZENNs retailed for $16,900 while actual cost was $65,000. Microcar brought electric vehicle production fully in-house with the M.Go Electric in 2009, and ZENN ceased production of its MC-based vehicle in 2010.

Gallery

Current models

Past models

References

External links 

UK site (English)
Microcar website (French)

Vehicle manufacturing companies established in 1984
Car manufacturers of France
Microcars
French brands
Electric vehicle manufacturers of France